Chang Ching-sen (born 8 October 1959) is a Taiwanese politician and devoted to the issues of resolving the North-South divide in Taiwan.

Early life
Chang obtained his bachelor's and doctoral degrees in civil engineering from National Taiwan University in 1982 and 1991, respectively.

Political career
In the mid-2000s, Chang was the vice chairman of the Council for Economic Planning and Development. He served as an advisor to Ko Wen-je's 2014 Taipei mayoral campaign. He was named a policy advisor to Tsai Ing-wen's 2016 presidential bid. After Tsai won, her designated premier Lin Chuan named Chang to the cabinet as a minister without portfolio on 7 April 2016. Three weeks before he took office on 20 May, Chang made controversial comments on Facebook about an urban renewal project in Shilin District. He apologized via Facebook two days after making the post, but later chose to deactivate his account on the social media platform.

Cross-strait relations
In September 2016 Chang made an unofficial statement that Mainland Chinese tourists are Taiwan's most needed friends, and to the Taiwanese that there is a difference between the Mainland Chinese people and the Mainland Chinese government.

References

1959 births
Living people
Local executives of places in Taiwan
Government ministers of Taiwan
Politicians of the Republic of China on Taiwan from Yunlin County
National Taiwan University alumni